Your Best Life Now: 7 Steps to Living at Your Full Potential is a book by pastor Joel Osteen. It was published on October 12, 2004, by FaithWords. There is also a calendar, board game, and study guide available based on the book. A 10th Anniversary edition was published on September 3, 2014.

Reception
The book was ranked #1 on The New York Times Self Help Best Seller list. It remained a bestseller for more than two years and has sold over 8 million copies.

Outline

 Vision
 Self-Image
 Power of Thoughts and Words
 Let Go of the Past
 Strength through Adversity
 Live to Give
 Choose to be happy

Criticism

In the 2010 West Coast Conference, "Christless Christianity", John F. MacArthur criticized this book as being a part of the prosperity gospel. Critics of prosperity gospel consider its teachings anathema to the gospel of Mark:

“Jesus, looking at the man, loved him and said, ‘You lack one thing; go, sell what you own, and give the money to the poor, and you will have treasure in heaven; then come, follow me.’ When the man heard this, he was shocked and went away grieving, for he had many possessions” (10:21-22). 

Osteen has made over $10 million from “Your Best Life Now,” keeping 90% of profits and donating the remainder to his church.

References

2004 non-fiction books
Self-help books
FaithWords books